Papaver gorgoneum is a species of flowering plants of the family Papaveraceae. The species is endemic to Cape Verde. It is listed as critically endangered by the IUCN.

Distribution and ecology
Papaver gorgoneum is restricted to the islands of Santo Antão, São Nicolau and Fogo. It grows in humid and sub-humid zones, mainly between 800 and 1,400 m elevation.

References

gorgoneum
Flora of Fogo, Cape Verde
Flora of Santo Antão, Cape Verde
Flora of São Nicolau, Cape Verde
Endemic flora of Cape Verde